Corte de Peleas is a Spanish municipality in the province of Badajoz, Extremadura. It has a population of 1,257 (2007) and an area of 42.3 km².

References

External links
Official website 
Profile 

 auto

Municipalities in the Province of Badajoz